The Howling: Reborn is a 2011 teen horror film directed by Joe Nimziki and starring Lindsey Shaw, Landon Liboiron and Ivana Miličević. It is the eighth film and a reboot of The Howling film series. The film was released on DVD on October 18, 2011.

Plot
Kathryn Kidman is attacked and apparently killed by a werewolf. Eighteen years later, Kathryn's son Will is living with his father Jack and is enrolled in a high school with an advanced security system. His best friend, Sachin, is making a horror film and is planning to broadcast it by hacking into news channels illegally. Will has a crush on Eliana Wynter, but her current boyfriend scares him away.

Later, Eliana invites him to a party, where a creature attacks. Will escapes. He later asks Sachin about werewolf lore. Will cuts himself and the wound heals instantaneously, proving that he is a werewolf.

It is revealed that Kathryn, now known as Kay, is still alive, but has become a werewolf. Kay kills Jack, then goes to Will's school to explain Will's werewolf heritage to him. Confronted with this truth, Will saves Eliana from other members of Kay's wolf pack. The invasion sets off the security system and the school enters automated lockdown mode, cutting off the school from the outside world.

Will remembers Sachin's advice that werewolves can only be killed by silver bullets or fire, so he and Eliana equip themselves with homemade flame throwers. They find Sachin just in time to see him killed by a werewolf. Sneaking off to the basement, they discover that Kay is raising an army of werewolves.

They fight their way out of the school. Eliana tries to goad Will to turn her into a werewolf, but he manages to restrain himself.

Kay captures Eliana to force Will to become a werewolf. Will fights Kay with weapons, but Kay is too powerful to be killed by silver bullets. Another werewolf attacks Kay and rips her heart out. The werewolf is Eliana, who was previously wounded by Will. Eliana and Will burn down the school to kill the other new werewolves.

Will creates a video in which he transforms on camera and warns the world about werewolves. It is circulated all over the world and humans prepare to battle against the new threat.

Cast
 Landon Liboiron as Will Kidman
 Lindsey Shaw as Eliana Wynter
 Ivana Miličević as Kathryn Kidman / Kay
 Jesse Rath as Sachin
 Niels Schneider as Roland
 Frank Schorpion as Jack Kidman
 Kristian Hodko as Tribe
 Sean Mercado as Pierce 
 Sacha Charles as Roddick
 Michael Stewart Grant as Stalker  
 Erin Agostino as Regina 
 Mark Camacho as Principal Larouche

Production
An international co-production film between Canada and The United States. The story is credited as being based on the novel The Howling II by Gary Brandner; however, the film instead has minor elements from the first novel.

Production began on the film in Canada in May 2010. The film was released direct to video in late October 2011.

Home video
Anchor Bay Entertainment released The Howling: Reborn on DVD and Blu-ray in the U.K. on 9 April 2012.

Critical reception 
The Howling: Reborn received negative reviews from critics. R.L. Shaffer from IGN DVD gave the film a 3/10: "Like the other sequels, The Howling: Reborn takes a great concept and completely flushes it down the toilet in order to exploit modern horror/werewolf trends". Felix Vasquez Jr. from Cinema Crazed gave it a rating of 2.5/4, calling it "a decent time killer with strong performances and a good head on its shoulder". Review aggregator Rotten Tomatoes gives the film a score of 17%, based on 6 reviews with an average score of 3.90/10.

References

External links
 
 
 

2010s supernatural horror films
American teen horror films
American supernatural horror films
Canadian horror films
Canadian supernatural horror films
2010s teen horror films
Direct-to-video horror films
The Howling films
Reboot films
American werewolf films
American high school films
Canadian werewolf films
Canadian high school films
Films set in New York City
2011 films
2010s English-language films
2010s American films
2010s Canadian films